Seymchan is a pallasite meteorite found in the dry bed of the river Hekandue, a left tributary of river Yasachnaya in the Magadan district, Russia, near the settlement of Seymchan, in June 1967.

History
The mass was a triangular-shaped thumbprinted meteorite lying among the stones of the brook bed. The main mass was turned over to the Academy of Sciences of the USSR.

Remarkably, about 20% of the new specimens were found to contain olivine crystals, and so revealed the silicated nature of the meteorite. The pallasitic structure was not previously discovered during studies on small metal-only sections of the original mass.

Composition and classification

Seymchan belongs to Main Group pallasites, but it is considered anomalous due to its high Iridium content. Before the discovery of its pallasitic structure it had been classified as IIE anomalous coarse octahedrite. Seymchan is considered a stable and rust-resistant pallasite.

Specimens
Due to the heterogeneous structure of Seymchan, there are two types of specimens: with or without olivine crystals. It is worthy to note that the specimen pictured to the left shows an interesting, seldom seen feature of iron meteorites. The Widmanstätten pattern on the left hand side of the specimen is visibly bent. This is caused by the shearing of the meteorite as it broke up during atmospheric entry and serves as testimony of the violent experience a meteor is subject to as it falls through the atmosphere.

See also
Glossary of meteoritics

References

External links

Meteoritical Bulletin Database

Meteorites found in Russia
Geography of Russia
1967 in the Soviet Union